Fabián Coito Machado (born 3 March 1967) is a Uruguayan football manager and former player who played as a defender. He is the current manager of Deportivo Maldonado.

Playing career
Born in Montevideo, Coito represented hometown sides  Montevideo Wanderers and Cerro before moving abroad in 1993, with Chilean side Provincial Osorno. In 1994, he joined Honduran side Olimpia, and retired with them in 1995, aged 28.

Managerial career

Uruguay
After starting out at Central Español in 2004, Coito was the coach of Uruguay's under-15, under-17 and under-20 national teams. He briefly was the manager of the senior Uruguay national team until Óscar Tabárez renewed his contract with ‘La Celeste’ and was reinstated as head coach.

Honduras
In February 2019, Coito left Uruguay and was announced as the new manager of the Honduras national football team. Coito’s first match for Honduras was on 26 March 2019, in a friendly goalless match against Ecuador. In the 2019 CONCACAF Gold Cup, Coito came under criticism as his Honduras side was eliminated very early on from the tournament after losing to Jamaica and Curaçao. Despite this, Honduras went on to win 4-0 against El Salvador giving Coito is first win with ‘Los Catrachos’. In 2021, Coito managed Honduras to a third place finish in 2021 CONCACAF Nations League Finals after beating rivals Costa Rica on penalties. Coito also managed Honduras throughout the 2021 CONCACAF Gold Cup where Honduras was eliminated in the Quarterfinals by Mexico. On 13 October 2021, Coito was sacked by Honduras after a string of poor results throughout the 2022 World Cup Qualifiers which included three losses and three draws in six matches.

Alajuelense
On 13 July 2022, Coito was appointed manager of Costa Rican side Alajuelense. On 10 November, after being eliminated from the league in the semifinals, he left the club.

Deportivo Maldonado
On 19 November 2022, Coito was confirmed as Deportivo Maldonado manager for the 2023 season.

Honours

Manager

International
Uruguay U20
South American Youth Football Championship: 2017

References

External links
 Profile at goal.com

1967 births
Living people
Footballers from Montevideo
Uruguayan footballers
Uruguayan expatriate footballers
Association football defenders
Uruguayan football managers
Uruguayan expatriate football managers
Central Español managers
Montevideo Wanderers F.C. players
C.A. Cerro players
Provincial Osorno footballers
C.D. Olimpia players
Chilean Primera División players
Liga Nacional de Fútbol Profesional de Honduras players
Uruguayan Primera División players
Expatriate footballers in Chile
Expatriate footballers in Honduras
Uruguay national football team managers
Honduras national football team managers
Uruguayan expatriate sportspeople in Chile
Uruguayan expatriate sportspeople in Honduras
2019 CONCACAF Gold Cup managers
2021 CONCACAF Gold Cup managers
Deportivo Maldonado managers